John Geddes (December 25, 1777March 4, 1828) was the 47th Governor of South Carolina from 1818 to 1820.

Early life and career
Born in Charleston, Geddes was the son of a merchant and received his education at the College of Charleston. He then studied law and was admitted to the bar in 1797. Afterwards, Geddes became active with the South Carolina militia as a Cavalry Major and later as a Major General.

Political career
In 1808, Geddes won election to the South Carolina House of Representatives and became Speaker of the House for two years. He was a member of the House of Representatives until his election to the South Carolina Senate in 1816. The General Assembly chose Geddes to be the Governor of South Carolina in 1818 for a two-year term because of his strong Republican views.

Later life and career
Upon leaving the governorship in 1820, Geddes was given the position of Brigadier General of the South Carolina militia. In 1821, he purchased the island of Key West from a sloop trader, but could not secure the rights of the island before John W. Simonton, who also claimed the island and was helped by some influential friends in Washington, D.C. He remained active in politics and ran for mayor of Charleston in 1823, serving from 1824 to 1825. Having felt that his honor was insulted by Edward P. Simons during the campaign, Geddes challenged Simons to a duel. Simons managed to fire four shots, two hitting Geddes' son in both of his thighs, but the duel resulted in Simons' death. Geddes died in Charleston on March 4, 1828, and was buried at the First Scots Presbyterian Churchyard.

References

External links
SCIway Biography of John Geddes
NGA Biography of John Geddes

1777 births
1828 deaths
History of Key West, Florida
Members of the South Carolina House of Representatives
South Carolina state senators
Governors of South Carolina
University of South Carolina trustees
American duellists
Mayors of Charleston, South Carolina
South Carolina Democratic-Republicans
Democratic-Republican Party state governors of the United States